Juha Tiainen (December 5, 1955 in Uukuniemi – April 27, 2003 in Lappeenranta) was a hammer thrower from Finland who won the gold medal at the 1984 Summer Olympics. The same year he achieved his personal best throw, 81.52 metres.

Achievements

External links

1955 births
2003 deaths
People from Parikkala
Finnish male hammer throwers
Athletes (track and field) at the 1980 Summer Olympics
Athletes (track and field) at the 1984 Summer Olympics
Athletes (track and field) at the 1988 Summer Olympics
Olympic athletes of Finland
Olympic gold medalists for Finland
Olympic gold medalists in athletics (track and field)
Medalists at the 1984 Summer Olympics
Sportspeople from South Karelia